Rhipha strigosa is a moth in the family Erebidae. It was described by Francis Walker in 1854. It is found in French Guiana, Panama, Venezuela and the Brazilian states of Pará, Rio de Janeiro and Amazonas.

References

Moths described in 1854
Phaegopterina